Diamond Head is a subsidiary peak of Mount Garibaldi in southwestern British Columbia, Canada. It is located west of Mamquam Lake on the south side of Mount Garibaldi in Garibaldi Provincial Park. It was possibly named by Canadian volcanologist William Henry Mathews for its resemblance to Diamond Head in Hawaii. The peak consists of tuff breccia ranging in size from dust to enormous blocks.

References

External links

Garibaldi Ranges
New Westminster Land District
Two-thousanders of British Columbia